The Panama Championship is a golf tournament on the Korn Ferry Tour. It is played annually at Panama Golf Club in Panama City, Panama. It is one of several tournaments on the Korn Ferry Tour held outside the United States.

The 2023 purse was $1,000,000.

Winners

Bolded golfers graduated to the PGA Tour via the Korn Ferry Tour regular-season money list.

See also
Panama Open

External links
Coverage on the Korn Ferry Tour's official site

Korn Ferry Tour events
Golf tournaments in Panama
Recurring sporting events established in 2004
2004 establishments in Panama